Santa Ana Canton is a canton of Ecuador, located in the Manabí Province.  Its capital is the town of Santa Ana.  Its population at the 2001 census was 45,287.

Demographics
Ethnic groups as of the Ecuadorian census of 2010:
Mestizo  50.3%
Montubio  42.1%
Afro-Ecuadorian  3.9%
White  3.6%
Indigenous  0.1%
Other  0.1%

References

Cantons of Manabí Province